There have been four baronetcies created for persons with the surname Rose, all in the Baronetage of the United Kingdom. Three of the creations are extant as of 2010.

The Rose Baronetcy, of Montreal in the Dominion of Canada, was created in the Baronetage of the United Kingdom on 9 September 1872 for the Canadian politician John Rose. On the death of the fourth Baronet in 1979 the title was passed on to Sir Julian Rose, 4th Baronet, of Hardwick House (see below).

The Rose Baronetcy, of Rayners in the County of Buckingham, was created in the Baronetage of the United Kingdom on 14 May 1874 for Philip Rose, founder of the Brompton Hospital for Consumption and legal adviser to the Conservative Party.

The Rose Baronetcy, of Hardwick House in Whitchurch in the County of Oxford, was created in the Baronetage of the United Kingdom on 19 July 1909 for the businessman and Liberal politician Charles Rose. He was the second son of the first Baronet of the 1872 creation. The fourth Baronet also inherited the Rose Baronetcy on Montreal in 1979 (see above).

The Rose Baronetcy, of Leith in the County of the City of Edinburgh, was created in the Baronetage of the United Kingdom on 2 July 1935 for the Scottish public servant Arthur Rose, Commissioner for Special Areas for Scotland under the Special Areas Act 1934. The title became extinct on the death of the second Baronet in 1976.

Rose baronets, of Montreal (1872)

Sir John Rose, 1st Baronet (1820–1888)
Sir William Rose, 2nd Baronet (1846–1902)
Sir Cyril Stanley Rose, 3rd Baronet (1874–1915)
Sir Francis Cyril Rose, 4th Baronet (1909–1979)
Sir Julian Day Rose, 5th Baronet (born 1947) (had already succeeded as fourth Baronet of Hardwick House; see below)

The Heir Apparent to both the Rose Baronetcy of Montreal and the Rose Baronetcy of Hardwick House is Lawrence Michael Rose (born 1986), only son of the current baronet.

Rose baronets, of Rayners (1874)
Sir Philip Rose, 1st Baronet (1816–1883)
Sir Philip Frederick Rose, 2nd Baronet (1843–1919)
Sir Philip Humphrey Vivian Rose, 3rd Baronet (1903–1982)
Sir David Lancaster Rose, 4th Baronet (born 1934)

Line of Succession

  Sir Philip Rose of Rayners, 1st Baronet (1816—1883)
  Sir Philip Frederick Rose of Rayners, 2nd Baronet (1843—1919)
 Philip Vivian Rose (1869—1917)
  Sir Philip Humphrey Vivian Rose of Rayners, 3rd Baronet (1903—1982)
 Bateman Lancaster Rose (1852—1912)
 Ronald Paul Lancaster Rose (1907—1977)
  Sir David Lancaster Rose of Rayners, 4th Baronet (born 1934)
 (1) Philip John Lancaster Rose (b. 1966)
 (2) Christopher David Rose (b. 1968)
 George Alfred Sainte Croix Rose (1854—1926)
 Ivor Sainte Croix Rose (1881—1962)
 (3) George Vivian Sainte Croix Rose (b. 1939)
  (i) Timothy Gerard Spellman Sanderson (b. 1958)
 (4) Philip Vivian Sainte Croix Rose (b. 1961)

Rose baronets, of Hardwick House (1909)

Sir Charles Day Rose, 1st Baronet (1847–1913)
Sir Frank Stanley Rose, 2nd Baronet (1877–1914)
Sir Charles Henry Rose, 3rd Baronet (1912–1966)
Sir Julian Day Rose, 4th Baronet (born 1947) (also succeeded as fifth Baronet of Montreal in 1979; see above)

The Heir Apparent to both the Rose Baronetcy of Montreal and the Rose Baronetcy of Hardwick House is Lawrence Michael Rose (born 1986), only son of the current Baronet.

Rose baronets, of Leith (1935)
Sir (Hugh) Arthur Rose, 1st Baronet (1875–1937)
Sir Hugh Rose, 2nd Baronet (1907–1976)

Notes

References
Kidd, Charles, Williamson, David (editors). Debrett's Peerage and Baronetage (1990 edition). New York: St Martin's Press, 1990, 

Sir Arthur Rose, Bt, obituary

Baronetcies in the Baronetage of the United Kingdom
Extinct baronetcies in the Baronetage of the United Kingdom